Elections to Sefton Metropolitan Borough Council were held on 2 May 2002. One third of the council was up for election and the council stayed under no overall control.

After the election, the composition of the council was:
Labour 26
Liberal Democrat 21
Conservative 16
Southport Party 3

Election result

Ward results

References

2002 English local elections
2002
2000s in Merseyside